Ranunculus acris is a species of flowering plant in the family Ranunculaceae, and is one of the more common buttercups across Europe and temperate Eurasia. Common names include meadow buttercup, tall buttercup, common buttercup and giant buttercup.

Description

Ranunculus acris is a herbaceous perennial plant that grows to a height of 30 to 70 cm, with ungrooved flowing stems bearing glossy yellow flowers about 25 mm across. There are five overlapping petals borne above five green sepals that soon turn yellow as the flower matures. It has numerous stamens inserted below the ovary. The leaves are compound, with three-lobed leaflets. Unlike Ranunculus repens, the terminal leaflet is sessile. As with other members of the genus, the numerous seeds are borne as achenes.

The rare autumn buttercup (R. aestivalis) is sometimes treated as a variety of this species.

The juice of the plant is semi-poisonous to livestock, causing blistering.

Distribution
The plant is native to Eurasia, but has been introduced across much of the world so that it now has a circumpolar distribution. It is a naturalized species and often a weed in parts of North America, but it is probably native in Alaska and Greenland. In New Zealand it is a serious pasture weed costing the dairy industry hundreds of millions of dollars. It has become one of the few pasture weeds that has developed a resistance to herbicides.

Ecology
R. acris is a species characteristic of grazed or mown neutral grassland communities, tending to occupy areas where drainage conditions are intermediate between those favoured by R. bulbosus in drier soils, and R. repens in wetter soils. Its abundance is said to be an indicator of grassland age and continuity but does not appear to be a good competitor in species-rich communities dominated by tall grasses.

The flower buds begin developing in late summer in the year before flowering. Floral development is promoted by low winter temperatures, and the plant passes the winter in a rosette form with small green leaves that appear to resist the ravages of frost. Reproduction occurs from seeds and short thick rhizomes that can split to form daughter plants

Cultivation
In horticulture the species may be regarded as a troublesome weed, colonising lawns and paths. However, it may be a welcome feature of wildflower meadows. The double-flowered cultivar R. acris 'Flore Pleno' has gained the Royal Horticultural Society's Award of Garden Merit.

Toxicity
Oils in the plant, probably present in the leaves and stems, contain the glycoside ranunculin, which when ingested can cause abdominal pains and intestinal disorders. When eaten by animals, the buttercups have caused blistering of the tongue and lips, diarrhea and blindness. Other symptoms of poisoning include ventricular fibrillation and respiratory failure.

Uses by Native Americans
The Abenaki smash the flowers and leaves and sniff them for headaches. The Bella Coola apply a poultice of pounded roots to boils. The Micmac use the leaves for headaches. The Montagnais inhale the crushed leaves for headaches.

The Cherokee use it as a poultice for abscesses, use an infusion for oral thrush, and use the juice as a sedative. They also cook the leaves and eat them as greens.

The Iroquois apply a poultice of the smashed plant to the chest for pains and for colds, take an infusion of the roots for diarrhea, and apply a poultice of plant fragments with another plant to the skin for excess water in the blood.

References

External links

Jepson Manual Treatment
Washington Burke Museum
Photo gallery

acris
Flora of Europe
Flora of Estonia
Flora of the United Kingdom
Flora of England
Flora of Norway
Medicinal plants
Plants described in 1753
Plants used in traditional Native American medicine
Plants used in Native American cuisine
Taxa named by Carl Linnaeus